Wait for Me (stylized as wait for me.) is the ninth studio album by American electronica musician Moby. It was released on June 29, 2009 by Little Idiot and Mute.

Background 
Moby began work on Wait for Me in 2008. He recorded the entirety of the album in his home studio in the Lower East Side of Manhattan, New York, with a set-up he described as "a bunch of equipment set up in a small bedroom". Discussing the start of the album's recording, Moby said:

Moby and David Lynch discussed the recording process of the album on Lynch's online channel, David Lynch Foundation Television Beta. Lynch also directed the music video for        "Shot in the Back of the Head," the first single from the album.

Ken Thomas mixed Wait for Me. According to Moby, "mixing the record with him was really nice, as he's creatively open to trying anything." For example, Moby and Ken Thomas recorded an old broken bakelite radio through some broken old effects pedals, which became the track "Stock Radio."

Release 
Moby announced the title, track listing, and release date of Wait for Me on his website on April 14, 2009. The announcement was accompanied by the release of the album's first single, "Shot in the Back of the Head," and its accompanying music video, directed by David Lynch. "Pale Horses" was released as the second single from Wait for Me on June 22, 2009. The following week, Wait for Me was released on June 29.

"Mistake" was released as the third single from Wait for Me, on September 14, 2009. Music videos for "Pale Horses" and "Mistake" were also released, both featuring the alien shown on the Wait for Me cover, a new design of the character "Little Idiot," who appeared in earlier Moby videos, including "Why Does My Heart Feel So Bad?" and "Natural Blues," and also provided the name of Moby's own label, on which the album was released.

Wait for Me: Ambient, a remix album consisting of ambient versions of songs from Wait for Me, was released as a digital download on November 2, 2009. Wait for Me was re-released as a deluxe edition on November 23, 2009 featuring the complete Wait for Me original album and two new songs, Wait for Me: Ambient, and a DVD featuring several live performances, an intimate EPK of the album, a section of questions and answers, and five music videos made for the album. Wait for Me. Remixes!, another remix album featuring reworkings of songs from Wait for Me by various producers, was released on May 17, 2010.

"One Time We Lived," one of the two new songs on the Wait for Me deluxe edition, was released as a single on November 15, 2009. 

"Wait for Me" was released as the fifth and final single from the album on May 2, 2010.

Critical reception 

At Metacritic, which assigns a normalized rating out of 100 to reviews from mainstream critics, Wait for Me received an average score of 65 based on 26 reviews, indicating "generally favourable reviews".

Tour 
Moby toured for Wait for Me with a full band, the first time he had used one since 2005.

In his journal entry on April 25, 2009, Moby wrote: "the touring for the upcoming album (barring sporadic dj dates) will be with a full band and multiple vocalists, although i might incorporate some elements of the electronic/ambient show, as it enabled me to perform some songs i’d never been able to perform before (like ‘god moving over the face of the waters’, and other instrumental songs from the past)."

Track listing

Deluxe edition bonus DVD

Personnel 
Credits for Wait for Me adapted from album liner notes.

 Moby – engineering, production, writing, instruments, vocals on "Mistake", artwork
 Hilary Gardner – vocals on "Hope Is Gone"
 Leela James – vocals on "Walk with Me"
 Ted Jensen – mastering
 Andy Marcinkowski – mix engineering (assistant)
 Kelli Scarr – vocals on "Wait for Me"
 Starr Black Shere – vocals on "Study War"
 Ken Thomas – mixing
 Melody Zimmer – vocals on "jltf"
 Amelia Zirin-Brown – vocals on "Pale Horses"

Charts

Weekly charts

Year-end charts

Certifications

References

External links 
 
 

Moby albums
2009 albums
Ambient albums by American artists
Mute Records albums
Albums produced by Moby